
Gmina Gołańcz is an urban-rural gmina (administrative district) in Wągrowiec County, Greater Poland Voivodeship, in west-central Poland.

Villages
Apart from the town of Gołańcz, Gmina Gołańcz contains the villages and settlements of Bogdanowo, Brdowo, Buszewo, Chawłodno, Chojna, Czerlin, Czesławice, Czeszewo, Grabowo, Gręziny, Jeziorki, Konary, Krzyżanki, Kujawki, Laskownica Mała, Laskownica Wielka, Lęgniszewo, Morakówko, Morakowo, Oleszno, Panigródz, Potulin, Rybowo, Smogulec and Tomczyce.

Neighbouring gminas
Gmina Gołańcz is bordered by the gminas of Damasławek, Kcynia, Margonin, Szamocin, Wągrowiec, Wapno and Wyrzysk.

References
Polish official population figures 2006

Golancz
Wągrowiec County